Elections for the House of Representatives of the Philippines were held on November 14, 1961. Held on the same day as the presidential election, the party of the incumbent president, Carlos P. Garcia's Nacionalista Party, won majority of the seats in the House of Representatives. However, Diosdado Macapagal of the opposition Liberal Party won the presidential election, leading to majority of the elected Nacionalista congressmen to defect to the Liberal Party. This led to Cornelio Villareal being elected Speaker of the House of Representatives.

The elected representatives served in the 5th Congress from 1961 to 1965.

Results

See also
5th Congress of the Philippines

References

  

1961
1961 elections in the Philippines